Belvosia is a genus of flies in the family Tachinidae.

Species
B. albifrons Robineau-Desvoidy, 1830
B. aldrichi Townsend, 1931
B. analis Macquart, 1846
B. ansata Reinhard, 1951
B. argentifrons Aldrich, 1928
B. atrata Walker, 1853
B. auratilis Reinhard, 1951
B. auripilosa Blanchard, 1954
B. aurulenta Bigot, 1888
B. australis Aldrich, 1928
B. barbosai Cortes & Campos, 1971
B. basalis Walker, 1853
B. bella Giglio-Tos, 1893
B. bicincta Robineau-Desvoidy, 1830
B. biezankoi Blanchard, 1961
B. bifasciata Fabricius, 1775
B. borealis Aldrich, 1928
B. bosqi Blanchard, 1954
B. bruchi Blanchard, 1954
B. campestris Robineau-Desvoidy, 1830
B. canadensis Curran, 1927
B. canalis Aldrich, 1928
B. catamarcensis Blanchard, 1954
B. chaetosa Blanchard, 1954
B. chiesai Blanchard, 1954
B. chrysopyga Bigot, 1887
B. ciliata Aldrich, 1928
B. contermina Walker, 1853
B. cuculliae Robineau-Desvoidy, 1830
B. elusa Aldrich, 1926
B. equinoctialis Townsend, 1912
B. ferruginosa Townsend, 1895
B. formosa Aldrich, 1928
B. formosana Blanchard, 1954
B. fosteri Townsend, 1915
B. frontalis Aldrich, 1928
B. fuscisquamula Blanchard, 1954
B. hirta Robineau-Desvoidy, 1830
B. lata Aldrich, 1928
B. leucopyga Wulp, 1882
B. lilloi Blanchard, 1954
B. lugubris Blanchard, 1954
B. luteola Coquillett, 1900
B. manni Aldrich, 1928
B. matamorosa Reinhard, 1951
B. mira Reinhard, 1958
B. naccina Reinhard, 1975
B. nigrifrons Aldrich, 1928
B. obesula Wulp, 1890
B. ochriventris Wulp, 1890
B. omissa Aldrich, 1928
B. piurana Townsend, 1911
B. pollinosa Rowe, 1933
B. potens Wiedemann, 1830
B. proxima Walker, 1853
B. recticornis Macquart, 1855
B. ruficornis Aldrich, 1928
B. rufifrons Blanchard, 1954
B. semiflava Aldrich, 1928
B. slossonae Coquillett, 1895
B. smithi Aldrich, 1928
B. socia Walker, 1853
B. spinicoxa Aldrich, 1928
B. splendens Curran, 1927
B. tibialis Blanchard, 1954
B. townsendi Aldrich, 1928
B. unifasciata Robineau-Desvoidy, 1830
B. vanderwulpi Williston, 1886
B. villaricana Reinhard, 1951
B. vittata Aldrich, 1928
B. weynberghiana Wulp, 1883
B. wiedemanni Aldrich, 1928
B. williamsi Aldrich, 1928
B. willinki Blanchard, 1954

References

Diptera of South America
Diptera of North America
Exoristinae
Tachinidae genera
Taxa named by Jean-Baptiste Robineau-Desvoidy